Dhurmus Suntali Foundation is a Nepalese charity founded primarily for victims of 2015 Nepali earthquakes. Since then, the foundation has expanded its projects like Gautam Buddha International Cricket Stadium. The charity was founded by well-known Nepalese comedians Sitaram Kattel and Kunjana Ghimire. Famous persons like Rekha Thapa and those from different countries have contributed to this charity.

Projects by Dhurmus Suntali Foundation

Flood Victim Relief 2074 
Dhurmus Suntali Foundation (DSF) conducted a brief flood victim relief campaign in 2074 BS. The founders themselves participated on the campaign and marked the beginning of the starting of the long loved foundation- Dhurmus Suntali Foundation.

Unified Santapur Model Village

Unified Musahar Model Village

Unified Gaurachaur Model Village

Unified Pahari Model Village

Model (Namuna) Nepal 
Namuna Nepal project aims to reconstruct the whole country by rebuilding structures that have been destroyed by Nepalese earthquake. The foundation has decided to make a park about the national symbols to attract tourists. The settlement will have communities of different castes, religions and ethnic groups from the hills, mountains and terai. Replicas in miniature of famous tourist destinations like the mountains, Muktinath Temple, Swayambhunath Stupa, Bauddhanath Stupa, Pashupati Temple, Mayadevi Temple, Janaki Temple, and Dharahara, among others, will be built on the premises of the settlement.

Kattel said that the foundation already has Rs 21.3 million in its reserve fund from previous projects that can be invested in the new project.

References

External links 
 

Charities based in Nepal
2017 establishments in Nepal